Mark David Hollis (4 January 1955 – February 2019) was an English musician and singer-songwriter. He achieved commercial success and critical acclaim in the 1980s and 1990s as the co-founder, lead singer and principal songwriter of the band Talk Talk. Hollis wrote or co-wrote most of Talk Talk's music—including hits like "It's My Life" and "Life's What You Make It"—and in later works developed an experimental, contemplative style.

Beginning in 1981 as a synth-pop group with a New Romantic image, Talk Talk's sound became increasingly adventurous under Hollis's direction. For their third album, The Colour of Spring(1986), Talk Talk adopted an art pop sound that won critical and commercial favour; it remains their biggest commercial success. The band's final two albums, Spirit of Eden(1988) and Laughing Stock(1991), were radical departures from their early work, taking influence from jazz, folk, classical and experimental music. While they were commercial failures in their own time, these albums were retrospectively highly critically acclaimed and have come to be seen as early landmarks of post-rock music.

After Talk Talk disbanded in 1991, Hollis returned to music in 1998 with a self-titled solo album, which continued the direction of Talk Talk's sound but in a more minimal, sparse, acoustic style. Following the release of his only solo album, Hollis largely retired from the recording industry. He died, aged 64, in February 2019.

Biography

Early life (1955–1977)
Hollis was born on 4 January 1955 in Tottenham, London. He had two brothers, one elder and one younger. Little is known about his early life as Hollis was a reluctant interviewee throughout his career. He attended Tollington School, a now-defunct grammar school in Muswell Hill, London. In one interview, he claimed to have quit pursuing an education before he had completed his ; in another, he said he had taken a course in child psychology at the University of Sussex but dropped out after a year and a half. Between school and the launch of his music career, he worked in factories and as a laboratory technician. Reflecting on this period in his life, he later said, "I could never wait to get home and start writing songs and lyrics. All day long I'd be jotting ideas down on bits of paper and just waiting for the moment when I could put it all down on tape."

The Reaction (1977–1979)
Ed Hollis, Mark's older brother, mentored Mark and introduced him to the music industry. Ed was a disc jockey, producer and manager of several bands, including the pub-rock group Eddie and the Hot Rods. With Ed's encouragement and assistance, Mark formed his first band, The Reaction. Emerging in the post-punk era, the Reaction's sound reflected Hollis's interest in early garage rock as found on the 1972 compilation Nuggets. In a later interview, Hollis said, "Up until punk there's no way I could have imagined I could get a record deal because I didn't think I could play, but punk said, 'If you think you can play you can play.'"

In 1977, The Reaction recorded a demo for Island Records. A song from the demo, "Talk Talk Talk Talk", featured on the punk compilation Streets, released by the record-store chain and fledgling label Beggars Banquet. Written by Hollis, "Talk Talk Talk Talk" is an early version of Talk Talk's 1982 second single, "Talk Talk". George Gimarc noted the Reaction's rendition of the song is about twice as fast and has "a completely different feel" than the 1982 version. Island released the Reaction's only single, "I Can't Resist", in 1978. George Gimarc likened "I Can't Resist" to early works by the Hollies and the Who. The Reaction disbanded the following year.

Around this time, Hollis's musical outlook broadened considerably. He began to listen to progressive rock like King Crimson and Pink Floyd, which were considered unfashionable in the punk era. His brother Ed introduced him to a wider range of music including jazz, particularly John Coltrane and Ornette Coleman. Miles Davis's collaborations with arranger Gil Evans on Porgy and Bess(1959) and Sketches of Spain(1960) had a lasting impact on Hollis; he later said Davis and Evans's work together "has space, tight arrangement and technique but it also has movement within it" and said those two albums "were extremely important albums to me then and they still are, because the values they work with are faultless."

Talk Talk

Hollis was best known for being the lead singer and primary songwriter of the band Talk Talk between 1981 and 1991. He was praised for his "always remarkable voice" and, along with Talk Talk's producer Tim Friese-Greene, took the lead in evolving the band's style from New Romantic into the more experimental and contemplative style that later became known as post-rock. Hollis has been credited with saying: "Before you play two notes, learn how to play one note. And don't play one note unless you've got a reason to play it."  He also commented: "The silence is above everything, and I would rather hear one note than I would two, and I would rather hear silence than I would one note."  In 1982, he cited his greatest influences as Burt Bacharach and William Burroughs.

Solo work and retirement
Talk Talk disbanded in 1991. In 1998, Hollis released an eponymous solo debut album, Mark Hollis. In an interview at the time, he said: "To me the ultimate ambition is to make music that doesn't have a use by date, that goes beyond your own time."  He also said: "Technique has never been an important thing to me. Feeling always has been, and always will be, above technique."

According to a 2008 article in The Guardian, he then largely retired from making music. He stated about his decision to retire from performing, "I choose for my family. Maybe others are capable of doing it, but I can't go on tour and be a good dad at the same time." Despite Hollis' absence from the public eye, he continued to be mentioned in the music press as an example of an artist who refused to sacrifice his artistic ambition for commercial success, as a yardstick for current artists and one of the most important musicians of his generation. His withdrawal from the public continued to fascinate music critics. By the time his solo album was released, Hollis had moved back from the countryside to London in order to provide his two sons with a more cosmopolitan environment.

In 2004, Hollis resurfaced briefly to receive a Broadcast Music Inc. Award for having written "It's My Life". In 2012, a piece of specially commissioned music by Hollis titled "ARB Section 1", was used in the television series Boss.

Collaborations
Hollis performed the solo track "Piano" on the 1998 minimalist album AV 1, by Phill Brown and Dave Allinson, under the pseudonym John Cope. This was later included on the 2001 Talk Talk compilation album Missing Pieces. He played piano on and co-wrote the track "Chaos" on the 1998 trip hop album Psyence Fiction by Unkle, later asking for his name to be removed from the album credits. He also co-produced and arranged two tracks ("The Gown" and "Big Mouth") on Anja Garbarek's 2001 album Smiling & Waving, as well as playing bass guitar, piano and melodica.

Personal life 
From  1998 until 2017, Hollis lived in Wimbledon, London with his wife Flick (a teacher) and their two sons, before moving to Heathfield, East Sussex where he lived until his death. Hollis' desire to spend more time with his family was a major reason that Talk Talk stopped touring after 1986, and his reason for retiring from the music industry in 1998.

Death 
Hollis died from cancer in February 2019, aged 64. Initial reports of his death included a tweet from his cousin-in-law, the paediatrician Anthony Costello, and a tribute by Talk Talk's bassist Paul Webb, before his former manager  confirmed Hollis's death to the media on 26 February.

Further tributes to Hollis included Duran Duran, Depeche Mode, The The, Steven Wilson, Alexis Taylor, Andy Kim, Charlotte Church, Flea, Roland Orzabal, Robin Pecknold, Peter Gabriel, Ryley Walker, Peter Hammill, Orchestral Manoeuvres in the Dark, Marc Almond, Elijah Wood, Kirin J. Callinan, Chris Baio and Broken Social Scene.

Discography

Solo album
 Mark Hollis (1998)

References

Notes

Citations

Bibliography

External links 
 Within Without – Talk Talk and Mark Hollis fan site with articles, interviews and other content (via the Internet Archive)
  Wyndham Wallace, "Living In Another World: Remembering Mark Hollis", The Quietus, 26 February 2019

1955 births
2019 deaths
20th-century British male singers
20th-century English singers
Alumni of the University of Sussex
British male songwriters
British synth-pop new wave musicians
Deaths from cancer in England
English male guitarists
English male singers
English new wave musicians
English pop singers
English rock guitarists
English songwriters
Male new wave singers
People from Tottenham
Polydor Records artists
Post-rock musicians